DeAndre Lewis Thompkins (born October 1, 1995) is an American football wide receiver who is a free agent.

Professional career

Philadelphia Eagles
Thompkins was signed by the Philadelphia Eagles as an undrafted free agent following the 2019 NFL Draft. He received $85,000 guaranteed if he signed. He was cut on August 30, 2019.

DC Defenders
Thompkins was selected in the 4th round of the 2020 XFL Draft by the DC Defenders. Thompkins made his XFL debut in Week 2 against the New York Guardians, recording 6 catches for 67 yards and a touchdown. He had his contract terminated when the league suspended operations on April 10, 2020.

Thompkins had a tryout with the New York Jets on August 19, 2020.

Pittsburgh Steelers
Thompkins was signed by the Pittsburgh Steelers on August 30, 2020, but was waived on September 5.

Green Bay Packers
On May 26, 2021, Thompkins signed with the Green Bay Packers. He was placed on injured reserve on August 16, 2021. He was released on August 25.

References

External links
Green Bay Packers bio
Penn State Nittany Lions bio

Living people
1995 births
Players of American football from North Carolina
People from Onslow County, North Carolina
American football wide receivers
Penn State Nittany Lions football players
Philadelphia Eagles players
DC Defenders players
Pittsburgh Steelers players
Green Bay Packers players